Kévin Gohiri (born 4 December 1986 in Paris) is a French professional footballer. He currently plays in the Ligue 2 for LB Châteauroux.

1986 births
Living people
French footballers
Footballers from Paris
Ligue 2 players
LB Châteauroux players
Association football midfielders